Preparedness is a research-based set of actions that are taken as precautionary measures in the face of potential disasters. Preparedness is an important quality in achieving goals and in avoiding and mitigating negative outcomes.

There are different types of preparedness, such as public health preparedness and local emergency preparedness or snow preparedness, but probably the most developed type is "disaster preparedness", defined by the United Nations as involving "forecasting and taking precautionary measures before an imminent threat when warnings are possible".  This includes not only natural disasters, but all kinds of severe damage caused in a relatively short period, including warfare.

Preparedness is a major phase of emergency management, and is particularly valued in areas of competition such as sport and military science. Methods of preparation include research, estimation, planning, resourcing, education, practicing and rehearsing.

Legislation

In the United States, legislation such as the Pandemic and All-Hazards Preparedness Reauthorization Act of 2013 (H.R. 307; 113th Congress), and the Public Response and Emergency Preparedness (PREP) Act enacted to develop the emergency personnel, procedures, drills, and plans needed in the event of an emergency.

Organizations promoting preparedness

In Canada, the Center for Preparedness is a federally incorporated, not-for-profit organization that promotes preparedness. There are various organizations provide emergency kit and its use globally [] and there are thousands of institutes/firms provides emergency kit and training to common people as well as kids around the globe.

Preparedness as a whole community activity

In the United States, before Hurricane Katrina, preparedness was largely viewed as the responsibility of first responders and other emergency services. In the aftermath of Katrina, it became evident that first responders can and will become overwhelmed in a large-scale disaster; unable to effectively respond to the emergency. Individual preparedness must be undertaken; ready to handle any disaster. The idea of whole community preparedness is "By working together, everyone can keep the nation safe from harm and resilient when struck by hazards, such as natural disasters, acts of terrorism, and pandemics." The Federal Emergency Management Agency (FEMA), individuals, families, businesses, faith-based and community groups profitable groups, schools and academia, media outlets, and all levels of governments must take an active role in preparedness efforts. A disaster will affect the whole community, so everyone must be ready, by making a plan, being informed, and taking action to mitigate the effects of future disasters.

See also

References

External links

 
Emergency management
Psychological attitude